The ST-506 and ST-412 (sometimes written ST506 and ST412) were early hard disk drive products introduced by Seagate in 1980 and 1981 respectively, that later became construed as hard disk drive interfaces: the ST-506 disk interface and the ST-412 disk interface. Compared to the ST-506 precursor, the ST-412 implemented a refinement to the seek speed, and increased the drive capacity from 5 MB to 10 MB, but was otherwise highly similar.

Beginning with its selection as the hard drive subsystem for the original IBM XT disk drive controllers supporting the ST-412 interface grew to become ubiquitous in the personal computer industry,  The ST-412 interface and its variants were the de facto industry standard for personal computer hard disks until the advent and wider adoption of the IDE or ATA interface in the early 1990s.

Both interfaces used MFM encoding; the subsequent extension of the ST-412 interface, the ST-412HP interface, used RLL encoding for a 50% increase in capacity and bit rate.

History 
The ST506 HDD was the first 5.25 inch hard disk drive, introduced in 1980 by Shugart Technology (now Seagate Technology). It stored up to 5 megabytes after formatting (153 cylinders, 4 heads, 26 sectors/track, 256 bytes/sector) and cost US$1,500. The similar, 10-megabyte ST412 HDD was introduced in late 1981 (with 306 cylinders). The ST225 was introduced shortly thereafter with 20 megabytes and half the height. All three used MFM encoding, a widely used coding scheme. A subsequent extension of the ST412 interface, the ST412HP interface, used RLL encoding for a 50% increase in capacity and bit rate.

The ST506 drive connected to a computer system through a disk controller. The ST506 interface between the controller and drive was derived from the Shugart Associates SA1000 interface, which was in turn based upon the floppy disk drive interface, thereby making disk controller design relatively easy.

The ST412 interface was adopted by numerous HDD manufacturers such that the interface became a de facto industry standard for disk drives well into the 1990s.

The limitations of the ST412 interface are 5 million transitions per second maximum on data lines, 16 heads, 4 drive units and a   cable length. The standard channel code for the ST412 (and ST506) is MFM with one data bit per transition for a data rate of 5 Mbit/s. The ST412HP RLL variant averages 1.5 data bits per transition for a data rate of 7.5 Mbit/s.

Interface to controller 

In the ST506 interface, the drive connects to a controller card with two ribbon cables carrying signals, while a third cable provides power.  The two signal cables are the wide 34-pin control cable and the narrow 20-pin data cable.  The control cable interface is very similar to the standard Shugart floppy disk interface; like that floppy disk interface, it can support four drives.  The data cable carries a read signal and write signal, both as differential binary signals: the two signal states correspond to the two possible differential signal polarities. The data represented by these signals is MFM, so the absolute signal states are not significant: the data is represented in the timing of the state transitions, like in floppy disk systems. While up to four drives can share a control cable, each drive has its own dedicated data cable connecting it to the hard disk controller (HDC).  Most HDCs supported only two drives.

The control card translates requests for a particular track and sector from the host system into a sequence of head positioning commands, including setting the direction of head movement, in or out, and sending individual "STEP" commands to move.  Four of the control cable pins, "HD SLCT 0" through "HD SLCT 3", allow the selection among up to 16 heads, although only four are available on the two-platter ST506. The original ST506/ST412 interface defined only two HD SLCT lines, providing supporting for only four heads, but a third HD SLCT line was shortly added to the design; a fourth was added a not much later by redefining the reduced Write Current signal, needed only by very early drives, as HD SLCT 3. Once the heads are properly positioned and the appropriate head is selected, data is read or written serially through a set of pins in the data cable. The limited bandwidth of the data cable was not an issue at the time and is not the factor that limited the performance of the system. However, the unshielded cable can sometimes be susceptible to high levels of noise.

The ST412 disk drive, among other improvements, added buffered seek capability to the interface. In this mode, the controller can send STEP pulses to the drive as fast as it can receive them, without having to wait for the mechanism to settle. An onboard microprocessor in the drive then moves the mechanism to the desired track as fast as possible. The ST506 disk drive without buffered seek averages 170 ms (similar to a floppy drive or modern optical drive) while the mechanically very similar ST412 disk drive with buffered seek averages 85 ms. By the late 1980s, drives with an ST412 interface were capable of average seek times between 15 and 30 milliseconds.

The process of moving portions of the command interpretation off the controller card and onto the drive itself in order to improve performance is a common feature of later hard drive connection schemes, notably SCSI, with its rich command set, and the storage-focused IDE systems. IDE, in effect, is a system for extending the computer bus so the interface controller can be built into the drive unit rather than being plugged into the computer's backplane. This allows a single "controller" card—really just an interface card—to communicate with multiple dissimilar drives, while it also reduces latency and noise between the controller and drive hardware. Effectively, the roles are reversed: instead of the controller doing almost all of the complex processing and the drive just transferring encoded data between the magnetic disks and the controller, the drive does almost all of the complex processing and the "controller" just transfers decoded data between the drive and the host system. In these systems, the operational details of the drive, like head selection and seeking, are entirely hidden from the host and handled within the drive's dedicated controller. These became known as "smart" drives, while ST506-like devices retroactively became known as "dumb".

While integrated controllers have many benefits, they also have a disadvantage: the mechanical drive (called the "head-disk assembly", or HDA) and the controller are effectively fused into a monolithic black box, so that if something goes wrong with the drive, it is nearly impossible to do anything about it—the data is usually irretrievably lost. With a separated controller and disk system like that of the ST506 interface, sometimes the problem can be resolved by connecting the disk drive, containing the actual (perhaps very important) data, to another compatible controller. Furthermore, an ST506 style interface makes it possible and easy not only to replace the controller without throwing away the data, but to get access to the analog data signals from the disk drive and process them through a special data recovery system that may be able to reconstruct data that a normal controller cannot read. Such data recovery techniques are much more difficult to execute on integrated drives, because the needed analog signals from the disk are not available at a standard interface and the internal data recording method, sector format, and disk organization of nearly every integrated drive model is different and secret.

Compatible systems and developments 

Many other companies quickly introduced drives using the same connectors and signals, creating a hard drive standard based on the ST506. IBM chose to use it, acquiring adapter cards for the PC/XT from Xebec and for the PC/AT from Western Digital. As a consequence of IBM's endorsement, most of the drives in the 1980s were based on the ST506. However, the complexity of the controller and cabling led to newer solutions like SCSI, and later, ATA (IDE). A few early SCSI drives were actually ST506 drives with a SCSI to ST506 controller on the bottom of the drive. Atari also used Adaptec ACB-4000A SCSI to ST506 converter inside its own line of SH204/SH205 external ACSI drives. Likewise a few early IDE drives were just drives with an ST412 interface attached to a controller board or chip. Ultimately all SCSI and ATA drives had built the controller into the drive, thereby eliminating the ST506/412 interface in such models.

Connector pinouts 
From ST506/ST412 OEM manual. In the following tables, "~" denotes a negated (active low) signal.

Notes

External links 

 ST506 MicroWinchester OEM manual. accessed 10-Jan-2022
 Archived version ST506 MicroWinchester OEM manual. accessed 03-Sep-2020

Hard disk drives
Computer storage buses